Feres (Katharevousa: Φεραί) is a former municipality in Magnesia, Thessaly, Greece. Since the 2011 local government reform it is part of the municipality Rigas Feraios, of which it is a municipal unit. The municipal unit has an area of 215.513 km2. Population 5,752 (2011). The seat of the municipality was in the town Velestino.

Feres is located near the ancient city of Pherae, after which it was named.

Notable people 
 Rigas Feraios (1757–1798), Greek Enlightenment writer and revolutionary

References

External links
 Population Information 

Populated places in Magnesia (regional unit)